Scott Ware (born May 5, 1983) is a former American football safety. He was signed by the Philadelphia Eagles as an undrafted free agent in 2006. He played college football at Southern California.

Ware was also a member of the Indianapolis Colts and Sacramento Mountain Lions.

College career
Ware went to Santa Rosa Junior College, graduated from the University of Southern California, and played safety for the 2004-05  USC Trojans.

Professional career

Philadelphia Eagles
Ware was signed by the Philadelphia Eagles as an undrafted free agent on May 1, 2006. He was released on August 26.

Indianapolis Colts
Ware was signed to the Indianapolis Colts practice squad on December 14, 2006. He was waived on December 26. The Colts signed Ware to a reserve/future contract on January 9, 2007. He was waived on September 1.

References

External links
 USC Trojans bio
Just Sports Stats

1983 births
Living people
Sportspeople from Santa Rosa, California
USC Trojans football players
Philadelphia Eagles players
Indianapolis Colts players
Sacramento Mountain Lions players